Shukriya (English Thank you, Hindi शुक्रिया) is an Indian reality television program, the first original program broadcast by Zindagi channel. It is produced by Frames Production. The show revolves around the channel’s philosophy of connecting hearts (originally Jodey Dilon Ko). Each episode promises to be an emotional and exciting journey and Shukriya will redefine the meaning of Shukriya, as it may mean the world to someone.

The channel has partnered with India’s largest Radio Network Big FM to bring alive the spirit of its first non-fiction show Shukriya.
The tag line of the show is 'Real People Aur Real Emotions Se Bana Ek Naya Reality Show' (English: A New Reality Show Made Up of Real People and Their Real Emotions).

Plot
In each of its episode to recognise and honour the spirit of the "uncommon" people who made the life of the common man special, Shukriya, provides a platform to individuals to share stories of their bonding with their loved ones and say "thank you" to them in front of camera. In each episode a person is thanked in a unique and creative way.

There was also a special episode on the occasion of Teacher's Day in which an ex student thanked his teacher in a unique way.

Host 

Shukriya is hosted by Actor, Anchor, Gunjan Utreja.

See also
 Zee Zindagi
List of programs broadcast by Zee Zindagi

References

External links 
  Shukriya on Zindagi

2015 Indian television series debuts
2015 Indian television series endings
Frames Production series
Zee Zindagi original programming